Cora itabaiana is a species of basidiolichen in the family Hygrophoraceae. Found in northeastern Brazil, it was formally described as a new species in 2016 by Manuela Dal Forno, André Aptroot, and  Marcela Cáceres. The specific epithet itabaiana indicates the  type locality, Serra de Itabaiana (State of Sergipe), the only place the lichen has been scientifically documented. Here, in an Atlantic Forest ecoregion, it grows as an epiphyte.

References

itabaiana
Lichen species
Lichens described in 2016
Lichens of Northeast Brazil
Taxa named by André Aptroot
Basidiolichens
Taxa named by Marcela Cáceres